Gigi may refer to:

Colette novella-related
 Gigi (novella), a 1944 novella by the French writer Colette
 Gigi (1949 film), a French adaptation of the novella by Jacqueline Audry
 Gigi (1958 film), an American musical by Vincente Minnelli, based on the novella
 Gigi (musical), a 1973 musical based on the 1958 film
 Gigi (play), a 1951 Broadway play based on the novella, starring Audrey Hepburn

Music
 Gigi (Canadian band), a Canadian pop music group
 Gigi (Indonesian band), a rock group from Indonesia
 Gigi (Hank Jones album), a 1958 jazz album by pianist Hank Jones
 Gigi (André Previn album), a 1958 jazz album by André Previn, Shelly Manne and Red Mitchell
 "Gigi" (song), from the 1958 film
 Gigi l'amoroso, a 1974 hit song by Dalida

People

Given name
 Gigi Causey, American producer 
 Gigi Edgley (born 1977), Australian actress
 Gigi Fenster, South African-born New Zealand author, creative writing teacher and law lecturer
 Gigi Foster, American-born Australian economist
 Gigi Garanzini (born 1948), Italian sports journalist
 Gigi Gaston, American writer-director
 Gigi Graciette, American television and radio personality
 Gigi Saul Guerrero (born 1990), Mexican-Canadian filmmaker and actress
 Gigi Hamilton (born 1965), Swedish singer and songwriter
 Gigi Hewitt born 1972), equestrian who represents the United States Virgin Islands
 Gigi Ion (born 1967), Romanian football player
 Gigi Lai (born 1971), Hong Kong singer and actress
 Gigi Leung (born 1976), Hong Kong singer and actress
 Gigi MacKenzie (born 1962), smooth jazz artist
 Gigi Militaru (born 1986), Romanian rugby union footballer
 Gigi Masin (born 1955), Italian composer
 Gigi Padovani (born 1953), article writer
 Gigi Parrish (1912–2006), American film actress
 Gigi Perreau (born 1941), American film actress
 Gigi Sohn, former president and co-founder of Public Knowledge
 Gigi Talcott (born 1944) is an American politician
 Gigi Vesigna (1932–2015), Italian journalist and writer
 Gigi Vorgan (born 1958), American writer and producer 
 Gigi Raven Wilbur, American bisexual rights activist and writer
 Gigi Yim (born 2005), Hong Kong singer and actress

Nickname
 Luigi Gigi D'Alessio (born 1967), Italian singer and songwriter
 George Gigi Becali (born 1958), controversial Romanian politician and businessman
 Gianluigi Buffon (born 1978), Italian football goalkeeper
 Gianna “Gigi” Bryant (2006–2020), the daughter of professional basketball player Kobe Bryant
 Jelena Noura Gigi Hadid (born 1995), American model and television personality
 Beatriz Gigi Fernández (born 1964), Puerto Rican former tennis player
 Gianluigi Gigi Galli (born 1973), Italian rally driver
 George Gigi Gryce (1925–1983), American musician, composer, arranger, educator and big band bandleader
 Luigi Gigi Meroni (1943–1967), Italian footballer
 Luigi Gigi Proietti (born 1940), Italian actor, director and singer
 Luigi Riva (born 1944), Italian former footballer
 George Gigi Tsereteli (born 1964), vice-speaker of the Parliament of Georgia
 Luigi Weiss (born 1951), Italian ski mountaineer and former biathlete

Stage name
 Gigi (singer) (born 1974), Ethiopian singer (real name "Ejigayehu Shibabaw")
 Gigi D'Agostino (born 1967), Italian DJ
 Gigi Goode (born 1997/8), American drag queen
 Gigi Gorgeous (born 1992), Canadian internet personality
 Gigi Perreau (born 1941), American actress

Surname
 Asha Gigi (born 1973), Ethiopian long-distance runner
 Robert Gigi (1926–2007), French cartoonist, illustrator and archivist

Other uses
 Gigi, the French name of the anime Magical Princess Minky Momo
 Gigi Morasco, a character on the American soap opera One Life to Live
 LELO Gigi, a sex toy

See also
 Igor Cassini (1915–2002), American syndicated gossip columnist nicknamed "Ghighi"
 Gigli (disambiguation)

Lists of people by nickname
Hypocorisms